The Yatasi (Caddo: Yáttasih) are Native American peoples from northwestern Louisiana that are part of the Natchitoches Confederacy of the Caddo Nation. Today they are enrolled in the Caddo Nation of Oklahoma.

History
Prior to European contact, the Yatasi lived in the area south of modern Shreveport.

In 1686, French explorer Henry de Tonti visited Yatasi settlements on the Red River. They welcomed the French expedition but did not provide him with guides. At the time, the Yatasi were fighting the Kadohadacho.

In the early 18th century, the Chickasaw tribe fought with Yatasi and killed a great number of them. With their numbers reduced, they joined the Ouachita, Doustioni, and Natchitoches Indians at the Natchitoches trading depot.

During this time the Yatasi traded with the French, then later the Spanish. The Yatasi provided bear fat and buffalo and deer hides for cloth, blankets, metal tools and weapons, combs, glass beads, flints, ammunition, vermillion dye, mirrors, and copper.

On 21 April 1770, French-born Indian agent of Spanish Louisiana, Athanase De Mézières y Clugny (c. 1715–1779) presented the Yatasi chief with a medal and presents from the King of Spain. That day the Kadohadacho and Yatasi both agreed to allow Spain proprietorship of their lands and promised not to supply the Comanche, Wichita, Tawakoni, and Kichai tribes with weapons or ammunition.

After the United States took over control of Louisiana, Dr. John Sibley became the Indian agent who oversaw relations with the Yatasi and neighboring tribes. They continued participating in the fur trade, providing bear, deer, beaver, otter, and other furs.

Language
The Yatasi spoke a Caddoan language and were culturally similar to surrounding groups such as the Adai. The Yatasi language is attested only in a nine-page vocabulary collected by Albert Gatschet in the 1880s and now archived at the National Anthropological Archives.

Synonymy
"Yáttasih" is a Kadohadacho term, meaning, "Those other people." They were also called the Yataché, Natasse, Yatache, Yattasses. Nada and Choye might be two additional Yatasi groups.

Notes

References
 Carter, Cecile Elkins. Caddo Indians: Where We Come From. Norman: University of Oklahoma Press, 2001. .
Edmonds, Randlett. Nusht'uhtitiʔ Hasinay: Caddo Phrasebook. Richardson, TX: Various Indian Peoples Publishing, 2003. .
 Kniffen, Fred B., Hiram F. Gregory and George A. Stokes. The Historic Indian Tribes of Louisiana from 1542 to the Present (Baton Rouge: Louisiana State University Press, 1987)
 Perttula, Timothy K. The Caddo Nation: Archaeological and Ethnohistoric Perspectives. Austin: University of Texas Press, 1997. .
 Sturtevant, William C., general editor and Raymond D. Fogelson, volume editor. Handbook of North American Indians: Southeast. Volume 14. Washington DC: Smithsonian Institution, 2004. .
 Swanton, John Reed. Source material on the history and ethnology of the Caddo Indians. Norman: University of Oklahoma Press, 1996. .

Caddoan peoples
Native American tribes in Louisiana
Native American history of Louisiana